The 2018–19 Adelaide Strikers Women's season was the fourth in the team's history. Coached by Andrea McCauley and captained by Suzie Bates, they finished sixth in the regular season of WBBL04 and failed to qualify for finals.

Squad 
Each 2018–19 squad featured 15 active players, with an allowance of up to five marquee signings including a maximum of three from overseas. Under a new rule, Australian marquees were classed as players who held a national women's team contract at the time of signing on for their WBBL|04 team.

Personnel changes before and during the season included:

 Sarah Coyte returned to the team for the first time since WBBL02, having won the WBBL03 championship playing with the Sydney Sixers.
 Overseas marquee Tammy Beaumont did not re-sign for the Strikers. The resulting vacant roster spot was filled by fellow England player Danielle Hazell.
 Local teenage all-rounder Eliza Doddridge completed the 15-player squad.
 Bridget Patterson fulfilled the wicket-keeping duties for the team in a 5 January 2019 match against the Brisbane Heat at Harrup Park, covering for Tegan McPharlin who had been granted leave.

The table below lists the Strikers players and their key stats (including runs scored, batting strike rate, wickets taken, economy rate, catches and stumpings) for the season.

Ladder

Fixtures 
All times are local time

Statistics and awards 

 Most runs: Sophie Devine – 556 (2nd in the league)
 Highest score in an innings: Sophie Devine – 99* (53) vs Hobart Hurricanes, 8 January 2019
 Most wickets: Sophie Devine – 14 (equal 14th in the league)
 Best bowling figures in an innings: Sophie Devine – 5/41 (4 overs) vs Melbourne Stars, 23 December 2018
 Most catches (fielder): Suzie Bates – 7 (equal 9th in the league)
 Player of the Match awards:
 Sophie Devine – 4
 Suzie Bates, Tahlia McGrath – 1 each
 Strikers Most Valuable Player: Sophie Devine
 WBBL|04 Player of the Tournament: Sophie Devine (2nd)
 WBBL|04 Team of the Tournament: Sophie Devine

References 

2018–19 Women's Big Bash League season by team
Adelaide Strikers (WBBL)